O-Desmethylangolensin (O-DMA) is a phytoestrogen.  It is an intestinal bacterial metabolite of the soy phytoestrogen daidzein.  It produced in some people, deemed O-DMA producers, but not others.  O-DMA producers were associated with 69% greater mammographic density and 6% bone density.

See also
 Equol

References

Dihydrostilbenoids
Phytoestrogens